Treffrin is a commune in the Côtes-d'Armor department in Brittany in northwestern France.

Population

Inhabitants of Treffrin are called treffrinois in French.

See also
Communes of the Côtes-d'Armor department
Goadec Sisters

References

External links

Communes of Côtes-d'Armor